John Costello (1850–1887) was a United States Navy sailor and a recipient of the United States military's highest decoration, the Medal of Honor.

Biography
Born in 1850 in Rouses Point, New York, Costello joined the Navy while living in that state. On that day, while Hartford was in Philadelphia, Pennsylvania, he rescued a shipmate who was a landsman from drowning. For this action, he was awarded the Medal of Honor eleven days later, on July 27.

Costello's official Medal of Honor citation reads:
On board the U.S.S. Hartford, Philadelphia, Pa., 16 July 1876. Showing gallantry, Costello rescued from drowning a landsman of that vessel.

Chief Boatswain John Costello
On 7 November 1888 there was a John Costello who was appointed as a boatswain (warrant officer) in the U.S. Navy. It is possible, but undetermined, if he was the same John Costello who earned the Medal of Honor. He served on the USS Oregon at the time of her historic cruise around Cape Horn during the Spanish–American War.

Boatswain Costello was promoted to chief boatswain on 3 March 1899 and retired from the Navy on 24 May 1902. He died on 31 August 1908 in Wilmington, New York.

See also

List of Medal of Honor recipients during peacetime

References

External links

1850 births
1887 deaths
People from Rouses Point, New York
United States Navy sailors
United States Navy Medal of Honor recipients
Non-combat recipients of the Medal of Honor